Linocut, also known as lino print, lino printing or linoleum art, is a printmaking technique, a variant of woodcut in which a sheet of linoleum (sometimes mounted on a wooden block) is used for a relief surface. A design is cut into the linoleum surface with a sharp knife, V-shaped chisel or gouge, with the raised (uncarved) areas representing a reversal (mirror image) of the parts to show printed. The linoleum sheet is inked with a roller (called a brayer), and then impressed onto paper or fabric. The actual printing can be done by hand or with a printing press.

Technique

Since the material being carved has no directional grain and does not tend to split, it is easier to obtain certain artistic effects with lino than with most woods, although the resultant prints lack the often angular grainy character of woodcuts and engravings. Lino is generally diced, much easier to cut than wood, especially when heated, but the pressure of the printing process degrades the plate faster and it is difficult to create larger works due to the material's fragility.

Linocuts can also be achieved by the careful application of art on the surface of the lino. This creates a surface similar to a soft ground etching and these caustic-lino plates can be printed in either a relief, intaglio or a viscosity printing manner.

Colour linocuts can be made by using a different block for each colour as in a woodcut, as the artists of the Grosvenor School frequently did, but, as Pablo Picasso demonstrated, such prints can also be achieved using a single piece of linoleum in what is called the 'reductive' print method. Essentially, after each successive colour is imprinted onto the paper, the artist then cleans the lino plate and cuts away what will not be imprinted for the subsequently applied colour.

Due to ease of use, linocut is widely used in schools to introduce children to the art of printmaking, using it to complete many tasks in the art lesson rather than going straight for the pencil and eraser; similarly, non-professional artists often cut lino rather than wood for printing. Nevertheless, in the contemporary art world the linocut is an established professional print medium, because of its extensive use by the artists of the Grosvenor School, followed by Pablo Picasso and Henri Matisse.

Emergence of the technique in America 
In 1911 “linoleum art” was first displayed in New York City by the Czech émigré Vojtěch Preissig.  In his publications on linocuts (1926–29) the respected American printmaker, Pedro Joseph de Lemos, simplified the methods for art schools and introduced new techniques for color linocuts, including the printing of the key block first.  The first large-scale colour linocuts made by an American artist were created ca. 1943–45 by Walter Inglis Anderson, and exhibited at the Brooklyn Museum in 1949.

Selected artists

 Josef Albers, German artist
 Peeter Allik, Estonian artist
 Valenti Angelo, American printmaker and illustrator
 Walter Inglis Anderson American artist
 Sybil Andrews English-Canadian artist
 Hans Anton Aschenborn, German painter 
 Georg Baselitz, German artist
 Torsten Billman, Swedish artist
 Emma Bormann, Austrian printmaker and painter
 Gail Brodholt, English artist
 Horace Brodzky, Australian/British artist
 Angel Botello, Spanish-Puerto Rican artist
 Margaret Burroughs, American artist
 Carlos Cortez, American poet and artist
 David Call, American Deaf artist
 Stanley Donwood, British artist
 Yvonne Drewry, English artist
 Janet Doub Erickson, American printmaker and artist
 M. C. Escher, Dutch artist
 Bill Fick, American printmaker and illustrator
 Folly Cove Designers American design collective
 Jacques Hnizdovsky, Ukrainian/American artist
 Helmi Juvonen, American artist
 William Kermode, Australian illustrator
 Gaga Kovenchuk, Russian artist
 Henri Matisse, French painter
 Pablo Picasso, Spanish painter
 Cyril Edward Power, English artist
 Everett Ruess, American painter, printmaker, writer, and poet
 Karl Schmidt-Rottluff, German printmaker and painter
 John Shaw, American/Canadian painter and printmaker
 Irena Sibley, Australian artist, children's book author, and art teacher
 James Blanding Sloan, American printmaker, educator, and theatrical designer 
 Ethel Spowers, Australian printmaker
 Ken Sprague, English artist and activist
 Hannah Tompkins, American artist and printmaker
 Tom Hazelmyer, American artist
 Gwen Frostic, American artist, poet, printmaker, writer

See also
 Block printing
 Gyotaku
 Letterboxing
 List of art techniques
 Printmaking
 Rubber stamp
 Through and through
 Woodcut
 Grosvenor School

References

Further reading
 Rice, William S., Block Prints: How to Make Them, Milwaukee: Bruce Publishing Company, 1941.
 Draffin, Nicholas, Australian Woodcuts and Linocuts of the 1920s and 1930s, South Melbourne: Sun Books, 1976.
30 Awesome and Fabulous Examples of Lino Printing articles by Artatm Creative Art Mazazine
photo series: Linocut articles by German printmaker Joachim Graf
Wheaton-Smith, Simon. Lino Cuts And Prints: How to screw them up, and how to fix them once you have. Free 200 page book.

External links

 Large scale hand printed linocut video
 Explanation of art term 'Linocut' on Tate Gallery website
 The Lino Printing Process

Printmaking
Relief printing
Woodcuts

fi:Taidegrafiikka#Linoleikkaus